Adedamola Adefolahan (born 5 February 1996), known professionally as Fireboy DML, is a Nigerian singer. He is signed to YBNL Nation, a record label founded by Nigerian rapper Olamide. His debut studio album Laughter, Tears and Goosebumps was released in 2019. He won Listener's Choice and was nominated for Song of the Year for "Jealous" at the 2020 Soundcity MVP Awards Festival.

Early life
Fireboy DML was born and raised in Abeokuta, Ogun state, and was a member of his church choir. He developed interest in music while studying at Obafemi Awolowo University.

Career

Breakthrough
His breakthrough single "Jealous" first appeared on YBNL Nation's collaborative album YBNL Mafia Family (2018), before being re-released on 25 March, 2019. The song is composed of guitar riffs, traditional drums and percussion; it combines African harmonies with elements of country and soul music. "Jealous" was produced by Cracker Mallo and is centered around love and the complicated feelings that go along with it. The visuals for "Jealous" was directed by Director K.

On 14 June 2019, Fireboy DML released the romantic single "What If I Say". It was produced by Pheelz, who incorporated a mix of percussion, ambient synth harmonies, and a drum riff into the production. The visuals for "What If I Say" was directed by TG Omori. On 1 August 2019, Fireboy DML released another single "King", in the song, he declares his worth to his love interest. The accompanying music video for "King" was directed by TG Omori; it contains images of Fireboy and his love interest in a rose petal embellished Rolls-Royce, as well as images of him singing at a fashion show where models walk on a runway.

Laughter, Tears and Goosebumps
Fireboy DML released his debut studio album Laughter, Tears and Goosebumps on 29 November, 2019. It was initially scheduled for release on 25 November. The album's music is a brand of R&B that combines love and social issues with empirical songwriting. LTG comprises 13 tracks and doesn't feature any guest artist; it amassed over 6 million streams on Spotify three days after its release. It received generally positive reviews from music critics, but was criticized for being labeled an "Afro-Life" record instead of an R&B album. LTG was supported by the previously released singles "Jealous", "What If I Say" and "King". The single "Vibration" was a fan favourite.

Apollo and Frozen
On 17 August 2020, Fireboy released the tracklist to his sophomore album, Apollo.

In a review, Pitchfork gave Apollo an 8.3 rating out of 10 and called it "the peak of his vision so far, a melodious, detailed, and effortless album of feel-good pop and R&B." NotJustOk wrote: "At the base of his writing is a deep-seated knack for introspection, the desire to be himself and a whole others like himself, spinning personal and borrowed accounts of existential crisis, ambition, love, lust and depression."

In 2021, Fireboy DML released the single "Peru," which Music in Africa wrote "affirms [his] Afrobeats intelligence." He was featured on Ladipoe's hit "Running" and WSTRN's single "Be My Guest", and Cheque's single "History."

He made a musical appearance on The Tonight Show Starring Jimmy Fallon and performed a medley of the songs "Vibration," from Tears, Laughter and Goosebumps, and "Champion," from Apollo.

On 24 December 2021, a version of Peru with Ed Sheeran was released and debuted on the United States' Billboard Hot 100 chart and peaked at number 2 on the United Kingdom's Official Singles Chart in 2022.  

On 3 March 2022, Fireboy was featured on the Sickick remix to Madonna's 1998 single "Frozen". The official music video was filmed on the same day.

On 6 July 2022, Fireboy announced via his official Twitter account that his third studio album titled "PLAYBOY" would be out by 5 August, 2022.

Artistry
Fireboy DML describes his sound as "Afro-Life" and said he writes songs that audiences can relate to. 
Alphonse Pierre of Pitchfork characterized his sound as "slow-groove pop" and said it "tells stories about love with the formulaic structure of a Hallmark Christmas romance".

He has cited Jon Bellion, Passenger and Wande Coal as his key contemporary influences.

In popular culture
In 2020, Fireboy DML gained media coverage in Nigeria when his hit "Champion" was used by FC Bayern Munich for their UEFA Super Cup celebrations.

His song "Scatter" from his debut album Laughter, Tears and Goosebumps was included in the FIFA 21 game soundtrack.

In November 2022, Fireboy DML's song, "Coming Back to You," was included on the Black Panther: Wakanda Forever soundtrack.

Discography

Studio albums

Singles

As lead artist

As featured artist

Awards and nominations

References

External link

Nigerian pop musicians
Living people
Yoruba musicians
English-language singers from Nigeria
Yoruba-language singers
Obafemi Awolowo University alumni
21st-century Nigerian musicians
Musicians from Abeokuta
1996 births